Wolfgang Büchner is a former slalom canoeist who competed for East Germany in the 1970s. He won a gold medal in the K-1 team event at the 1973 ICF Canoe Slalom World Championships in Muotathal.

References

German male canoeists
Possibly living people
Year of birth missing
Medalists at the ICF Canoe Slalom World Championships